Christoforou may refer to:

People with the surname
Christakis Christoforou (born 1964), Cypriot football manager.
Constantinos Christoforou, Cypriot singer.
John Christoforou (1921-2014), British painter.
Kypros Christoforou (born 1993), Cypriot football player.